Crossarchus is a mongoose genus, commonly referred to as kusimanse, often cusimanse, mangue, or dwarf mongoose. They are placed in the subfamily Mungotinae, which are small, highly social mongooses.

Range and habitat
Members of this genus are found in the swamplands and forests of central and western Africa, in the countries of Ghana, Ivory Coast, Liberia, and Sierra Leone.

Species

Diet
They feed on insects, larvae, small reptiles, crabs and berries. They use their claws and snouts for digging in leaf litter, under rotted trees and stones for the insects and larvae. They will also wade into shallow streams looking for freshwater crabs.

In most areas where members of Crossarchus live, they are the numerically dominant members of the forest carnivore community.

Reproduction
Females are polyestrus and if not mated will come into heat nine times in a year. Litters range from 2-3 per year. The young can open their eyes in about twelve days, eating solid food in three weeks and have adult hair in five weeks.

Behavior
Crossarchus live in groups of 10 to 24. One to three families live in a group. The families are made up of the mating pair and the young. They are diurnal, and will wander throughout their territories constantly, never staying in one place too long. In their wanderings they will create temporary shelters for themselves. As they do not occupy permanent den sites, the young are not able to keep up with the group for several weeks and must be carried to different foraging spots. Individuals in the group take turns carrying the young from place to place and also help feed them.

Since the sociable kusimanses do not live in open habitat, they maintain contact in the dense rainforest understory by giving constant whistling calls while traveling.

Local names
They are known in French as Mangouste brune and in German as Dunkelkusimanse.

References

Mongooses of Sub-Saharan Africa
 
Taxa named by Georges Cuvier